The Unlovables are a New York City based pop punk band.  The band formed after bassist/singer Hallie Bulleit recorded a handful of songs for a present with Adam Rabuck (of Dirt Bike Annie) who encouraged her to continue playing music.  Despite a somewhat revolving lineup, the band has remained fairly active over the years, including recording and releasing two full-length records on Whoa Oh Records as well as EP's and other compilation appearances, and tours often, not including other shows with mc chris, as well as the recently reunited Lifetime. and Weston The band became more mainstream after Adult Swim used the song "What you want, what you got" in a 30-second Bleach Promo. The band is currently taking a long hiatus while Hallie performs in the off-Broadway show FUERZABRUTA.

Discography

Full lengths 
 Heartsickle CD - Whoa Oh Records  LP - Crafty Records
 Crush, Boyfriend, Heartbreak CD - Whoa Oh Records

Splits
"Reunion Show" (split LP w/ Dirt Bike Annie) - Whoa Oh Records

EPs
 "Singles Club" 7 Volume 15" - Art Of The Underground Records
 "Punk Rock Club" CDEP - Knock Knock Records

Compilations
 NY vs NJ Punk Rock Battle Royal" CD - Crafty Records
 Nut Boppin' Whoppers - Squirrel Records
 God Save The Queers - Asian Man Records

Video/DVD
 Chemical X DVD Music Video Compilation - Geykido Comet Records
 Weekend At Bernies (The Queers) - Doheny Records

References

External links
 Unlovables Myspace Page
 Whoa Oh Records

Musical groups from New York City
Pop punk groups from New York (state)